The stream bluet (Enallagma exsulans) is a species of American bluet damselflies in the family Coenagrionidae. Its length is 29–37 mm. Many bluet species prefer ponds and lakes; the stream bluet as its name implies is most at home along moving waters. It can be found along small to medium-sized rivers. It is occasionally found at lakes too. In many species of damselflies the males have a blue tip to the abdomen. Enallagma exsulans is one of those less common cases where the female, too, has a blue abdominal tip. Summertime is the best time to look for stream bluets.

Distribution 
United States: (Alabama • Arkansas • Colorado • Connecticut • Delaware • Florida • Georgia • Iowa • Illinois • Indiana • Kansas • Kentucky • Louisiana • Massachusetts • Maryland • Maine • Michigan • Minnesota • Mississippi • Nebraska • North Carolina • New Hampshire • New Jersey • Ohio • Pennsylvania • Rhode Island • South Carolina • Tennessee • Texas • Vermont • Wisconsin • West Virginia)
Canada: (Manitoba • New Brunswick • Ontario • Quebec)

Similar species 
Stream bluets look similar to turquoise bluets.

References 

 Enallagma exsulans, Stream Bluet, Family Coenagrionidae
 Enallagma exsulans (Stream Bluet)
 NHL Stream Bluet
 Lam, E. (2004). Damselflies of the Northeast. Forest Hills, NY:Biodiversity Books. p. 64.
 DuBois, Bob (2005). Damselflies of the North Woods. Duluth, MN: Kollath-Stensaas Publ. p. 88-89.

Coenagrionidae
Odonata of North America
Insects of Canada
Insects of the United States
Fauna of the Eastern United States
Insects described in 1861
Taxa named by Hermann August Hagen